Lakshyya TV is a Bhubaneswar-based Odia 24/7 entertainment channel and website from Lakshyya Entertainment Ltd which is one of Odisha’s leading television, media and entertainment companies. It strives to be amongst the largest producers and aggregators of Odia programming in Odisha.

See also
List of Odia-language television channels
List of television stations in India

External links
https://lakshya.tv/

Odia-language television channels
Companies based in Bhubaneswar
Television stations in Bhubaneswar
Year of establishment missing
Television channels and stations established in 2010